& is the fourth studio album by French singer Julien Doré, released on 14 October 2016. The album debuted at number one in France and Wallonia. "Le lac", released as the first single from the album, also reached number one on the French singles chart.

Track listing

Charts

Weekly charts

Year-end charts

Certifications

Release history

See also
List of number-one hits of 2016 (France)

References

2016 albums
Julien Doré albums
Sony Music France albums